Prestonbury Castle is an Iron Age Hill fort on the north east edge of Dartmoor in Devon, England.

References

External links
Roman Britain
The Modern Antiquarian
The Dartmoor Archive

Hill forts in Devon